New Eastern Europe is a bimonthly political news magazine based in Krakow, Poland. The magazine covers articles about the news and affairs related to central and eastern Europe.

History and profile
New Eastern Europe, headquartered in Krakow, was first published in 2011. The magazine provides news and opinion articles on former Eastern Bloc countries. The publishers are The Jan Nowak-Jezioranski College of Eastern Europe and the European Solidarity Centre. The magazine is published bimonthly in English.

References

External links

2011 establishments in Poland
Bi-monthly magazines
English-language magazines
Magazines established in 2011
Mass media in Kraków
News magazines published in Poland
Political magazines published in Poland